St. Joseph's Higher Secondary School Baramulla (commonly referred to as the St. Josephs School Baramulla or SJS) is a private school located in Baramulla, Jammu and Kashmir, India. The school has been upgraded to the status of a higher secondary school and has also started online education, the first in the Kashmir valley. St. Josephs School is located in the city of Baramulla. It has around 4,000 students and over 125 staff members.

The school was founded by the Mill Hill Fathers or Mill Hill Missionaries from London in 1903, owned by the Catholic Diocese of Jammu-Srinagar and is administered by its Education Society (Reg. No. 1601-S of 1989) under the provisions of article 30(1) of the Constitution; for everyone without any distinction of religion, caste, creed or colour.

History

The foundation of St. Josephs School Baramulla was laid by Father C. Simon, in late 18th century and eventually in 1903 he established the school. St. Joseph's School is one of the oldest missionary schools in Kashmir valley. The school was founded and run by Saint Joseph's Missionary Society of Mill Hill as a Boarding school initially. It was run by Society of Jesus after Mill Hill Missionaries left the mission.

Alumni
 Maqbool Bhat- Kashmiri Revolutionary Leader, Journalist, author, philosopher, humanist and founder of National Liberation Front (NLF)and then declared leader of Jammu Kashmir Liberation Front (JKLF).
 Mohammad Najibullah – Afghan President
 Syed Altaf Bukhari - Indian Politician
Muhammad Ashraf Bukhari – Bureaucrat
Muhammad Yusuf Saraf- Chief Justice of the Azad Kashmir High Court

References

External links
Official website

See also 
List of Schools in India
List of Christian Schools in India

Private schools in Jammu and Kashmir
Christian schools in Jammu and Kashmir
Educational institutions established in 1901
1901 establishments in India
Baramulla
Catholic schools in India
Schools founded by missionaries